The 2014–15 season is the 43rd season in AD Alcorcón’s history and the 5th in the second-tier.

Squad
As 2015..

(captain)

Competitions

Overall

Liga

League table

Matches
Kickoff times are in CET.

Copa del Rey

Second round

References

AD Alcorcón seasons
Alcorcon